This is a list of episodes for the fourth season of the TV series Charlie's Angels. Originally aired from September 12, 1979 to May 7, 1980 for a total of 25 episodes, the season starred Jaclyn Smith, Cheryl Ladd, David Doyle, and introduced Shelley Hack as new angel Tiffany Welles, a police graduate from Boston. Original star Farrah Fawcett also reprises her role as Jill Munroe in three episodes.

The fourth season of the show saw a further decline in viewing figures, but still remained in the top 20 (#17 in the Nielsen chart); some believing Shelley Hack was to blame, others are of the opinion that the change in format from team oriented episodes to episodes that focused on only one Angel caused the rating decline.

Season 4 also has the only episode of the entire series without Charlie ("Avenging Angel").

Main cast
Jaclyn Smith as Kelly Garrett (regular) 
Cheryl Ladd as Kris Munroe (regular) 
Shelley Hack as Tiffany Welles (regular) 
David Doyle as John Bosley (regular)
John Forsythe as Charles "Charlie" Townsend (regular, voice only)

Notable guest stars
Farrah Fawcett as Jill Munroe (3 episodes)
Bert Convy
Robert Englund
Dick Sargent 
Steve Kanaly 
Timothy Dalton 
Sally Kirkland 
Joanna Pettet 
Tab Hunter 
Barbara Stanwyck 
Patrick Duffy
Robert Reed 
Cesar Romero
Ray Milland 
Marilù Tolo

Episodes

References

04
1979 American television seasons
1980 American television seasons